Jorge Vaca (born 14 December 1959) is a Mexican former professional boxer who held the World Welterweight Championship.

Professional career

Vaca turned pro in 1978 and captured the WBC and Lineal welterweight title by beating Lloyd Honeyghan via 8th round technical decision in 1987, but lost the belt to Honeyghan via 3rd KO in a rematch in 1988. Later that year he took on IBF Welterweight Title holder Simon Brown, but lost the bout via 3rd TKO.  Although he never got a shot again at another major title, Vaca was destroyed by a relatively young Roy Jones Jr. in one round, in the Light-Middleweight weight-class in 1992. He continued to fight until 2002, mostly in his native Mexico, and retired after a loss to Marco Antonio Rubio. Vaca finished with a record of 66 wins, 24 losses, 2 draws, with 51 knockouts.

Professional boxing record

See also
List of Mexican boxing world champions
List of world welterweight boxing champions

References

External links

1959 births
Living people
Mexican male boxers
Boxers from Jalisco
Sportspeople from Guadalajara, Jalisco
Light-middleweight boxers
World welterweight boxing champions
World Boxing Council champions
The Ring (magazine) champions